Francke is a German surname. Notable people with the surname include:

 August Hermann Francke (1663–1727), German Protestant theologian
Arne Francke (1904–1973), Swedish horse rider
 Gloria Niemeyer Francke (1922–2008), American pharmacist and science writer
 Kuno Francke (1855–1930), educator and historian
 Malcolm Francke (born 1939), Australian cricketer
 Master Francke (c.1380–1440), German painter
 Michael Francke (1946–1989), Director of the Oregon Department of Corrections
 Paul Francke (architect) (c.1537-1615), German architect and master builder
 Paul Francke (footballer) († 1914-1918), German football player and founder member of Bayern Munich
 Paul Francke (geologist) (1897-1957), German geologist
 Paul Francke (musician) (born 1979), American musician
 Rend al-Rahim Francke (born 1949), Iraqi political activist and ambassador to the United States
 Rudolf Francke, German First World War flying ace

See also 
 Franke
 Francken
 Franck (disambiguation)

German-language surnames